Events from the year 2009 in Argentina.

Incumbents
 President: Cristina Fernández de Kirchner
 Vice president: Julio Cobos

Governors
Governor of Buenos Aires Province: Daniel Scioli 
Governor of Catamarca Province: Eduardo Brizuela del Moral 
Governor of Chaco Province: Juan Carlos Bacileff Ivanoff 
Governor of Chubut Province: Mario Das Neves 
Governor of Córdoba: Juan Schiaretti 
Governor of Corrientes Province: Arturo Colombi (until 10 December); Ricardo Colombi (starting 10 December)
Governor of Entre Ríos Province: Sergio Urribarri 
Governor of Formosa Province: Gildo Insfrán
Governor of Jujuy Province: Walter Barrionuevo 
Governor of La Pampa Province: Óscar Jorge 
Governor of La Rioja Province: Luis Beder Herrera 
Governor of Mendoza Province: Francisco Pérez 
Governor of Misiones Province: Maurice Closs 
Governor of Neuquén Province: Jorge Sapag 
Governor of Río Negro Province: Miguel Saiz 
Governor of Salta Province: Juan Manuel Urtubey 
Governor of San Juan Province: José Luis Gioja 
Governor of San Luis Province: Alberto Rodríguez Saá
Governor of Santa Cruz Province: Daniel Peralta 
Governor of Santa Fe Province: Hermes Binner 
Governor of Santiago del Estero: Gerardo Zamora
Governor of Tierra del Fuego: Fabiana Ríos 
Governor of Tucumán: José Alperovich

Vice Governors
Vice Governor of Buenos Aires Province: Alberto Balestrini 
Vice Governor of Catamarca Province: Marta Grimaux 
Vice Governor of Chaco Province: Juan Carlos Bacileff Ivanoff 
Vice Governor of Corrientes Province: Tomás Rubén Pruyas (until 10 December); Pedro Braillard Poccard (starting 10 December)
Vice Governor of Entre Rios Province: José Lauritto 
Vice Governor of Formosa Province: Floro Bogado 
Vice Governor of Jujuy Province: Pedro Segura 
Vice Governor of La Pampa Province: Luis Alberto Campo 
Vice Governor of La Rioja Province: Teresita Luna 
Vice Governor of Misiones Province: Sandra Giménez 
Vice Governor of Neuquén Province: Ana Pechen 
Vice Governor of Rio Negro Province: Bautista Mendioroz 
Vice Governor of Salta Province: Andrés Zottos 
Vice Governor of San Juan Province: Rubén Uñac 
Vice Governor of San Luis Province: Jorge Luis Pellegrini 
Vice Governor of Santa Cruz: Luis Martínez Crespo 
Vice Governor of Santa Fe Province: Griselda Tessio 
Vice Governor of Santiago del Estero: Ángel Niccolai 
Vice Governor of Tierra del Fuego: Carlos Basanetti

Events

January
 3–17 January – Dakar Rally
 19–25 January – Tour de San Luis

February
 16–22 February – Copa Telmax

March
 26–17 March – Pan American Judo Championships

April
 23–26 April – Rally Argentina

June
 28 June – legislative election

July
 8 July – Copa Libertadores Finals

August
 22–23 August – South American Ski Mountaineering Championship
 26–31 August – A heat wave hits Argentina

Deaths
 31 March – Raúl Alfonsín, former President of Argentina
 4 October – Mercedes Sosa, singer

See also

 List of Argentine films of 2009
 2009 flu pandemic in Argentina
 2009 TC 2000 season
 Argentina at the 2009 World Championships in Athletics

References

External links

 
Years of the 21st century in Argentina